Ishak Rahuman is a  Sri Lankan politician and a member of the Sri Lankan parliament from Anuradhapura Electoral District as a member of the Samagi Jana Balawegaya.

References

Samagi Jana Balawegaya politicians
Living people
Members of the 16th Parliament of Sri Lanka
Members of the 15th Parliament of Sri Lanka
Year of birth missing (living people)